Indian (also known as Indian Valley) is a community in the Municipality of Anchorage, Alaska, United States. It lies in a valley in the Chugach Mountains near the middle of the north shore of the Turnagain Arm of Cook Inlet.

Description
The community is located just west of Indian Creek and north of the Seward Highway within the Indian Valley. (The Seward Highway provides the only roadway access to Indian.) Although not part of the Chugach State Park, the community is entirely surrounded by the park.

Although the Alaska Railroad passes through the southern edge of the community (and has a siding that runs most of the length of community) none of the railroad's regular passenger trains stop in Indian. However, there are two special event trains that operate out of the Anchorage station that turn around (reverse direction) in Indian before returning to Anchorage. These two trains include the annual Easter Train and the Holiday Train (which runs twice each day on selected Saturdays in December). Neither train allows passengers to disembark in Indian.

The origin of the community (and currently one of the main attractions) is the Indian Valley Mine. The mine was established 1920 and is currently listed on the National Register of Historic Places.

See also

 Alaska Railroad
 Chugach State Park
 Indian Valley Mine
 Seward Highway
 Turnagain Arm

References

External links
 Indian Valley Mine (official website)

Anchorage metropolitan area
Unincorporated communities in Anchorage, Alaska
Unincorporated communities in Alaska